The 2012–13 KNVB Cup was the 95th season of the Dutch national football knockout tournament. The competition began on 21 August 2012 with the matches of Round 1 and ended with the final on 9 May 2013.

PSV Eindhoven were the defending champions, having won the cup the previous season.
The winners qualified for the play-off round of the 2013–14 UEFA Europa League.

Participants 
92 teams participated in the 2012-13 cup. The 18 clubs of the Eredivisie and the 18 clubs of the Eerste divisie qualified automatically, entering in the second round. Other teams qualify by winning period titles in the previous year's competition or by winning a local KNVB Cup, called 'districtsbeker', for clubs from level 3 onwards, in the previous season.

Teams marked green are still active in the tournament.

Calendar
The calendar for the 2012–13 KNVB Cup is as follows.

First round
56 amateur clubs competed in this stage of the competition for a place in the Second Round. These matches took place on 21 and 22 August 2012.

|}

Second round
The 28 winners from the First Round entered in this stage of the competition along with the 18 Eerste Divisie clubs and the 18 Eredivisie clubs. These matches took place from 25 to 27 September 2012.

 

|}

Third round
These matches took place from 30 October to 1 November 2012.

|}

Fourth round
These matches took place from 18 to 20 December 2012.

|}

Quarter-finals
These matches will take place from 29 to 31 January 2013.

|}

Semi-finals

Final

Participants per round
The number of participants per league per round was as follows:

References

External links
 

2012-13
2012–13 domestic association football cups
KNVB